Stan Leonard (February 2, 1915 – December 15, 2005) was a Canadian professional golfer who played on the PGA Tour in the 1950s and 1960s. Leonard won three PGA Tour events, eight Canadian PGA Championships, and 16 other events on the Canadian Tour. He is a member of the Canadian Golf Hall of Fame.

Early years
Leonard was born in Vancouver, British Columbia. He worked as a caddie, and had success in top British Columbia events. He became a professional golfer in 1938, and played almost exclusively, and very successfully, on the Canadian Professional Golf Tour until 1954, while concurrently maintaining a club job at the Marine Drive Golf Club in Vancouver. He competed mainly in western Canada; money was tight, prize money was low, and travel costs to eastern Canada were high. In one of his early events on the PGA Tour, Leonard challenged to win the 1946 Crosby Pro-Am in California, before losing to Lloyd Mangrum.

Canadian success
Leonard won the Canadian PGA Championship eight times from 1940–1961, and this is a record. He was the low Canadian in the Canadian Open nine times from 1945–1961. He won the British Columbia Open five times, the Alberta Open nine times, and the Saskatchewan Open twice. He won a total of six significant amateur and 40 professional tournaments in Canada over the course of his career – second only to Moe Norman in Canadian golf history.

International success
Leonard won the individual title at the Canada Cup in both 1954 and 1959. Leonard joined the PGA Tour full-time in 1954, at age 39. He won three PGA Tour events between 1957 and 1960. He enjoyed a great deal of success in one major tournament – The Masters. His best finishes at the Augusta National Golf Club were T-4 in 1958 and 1959, T-8 in 1955 and T-9 in 1960. Leonard's game was respected by his PGA Tour rivals; legend Sam Snead said that he was glad Leonard had not come out onto the PGA Tour full-time until he was 40 years old!

Later years
Leonard retired from the PGA Tour in the 1960s, and took a club pro job at the Desert Island Golf Club in Palm Springs, California; however, he eventually made his way back home to Vancouver. He competed successfully at the Senior level in Canada, winning three Canadian Senior PGA Championships between 1967 and 1975.

He assisted in designing the Redwood Meadows Golf Course, in Bragg Creek, Alberta, near Calgary.

Leonard was one of the best ball strikers and longest hitters of his era, despite being a diminutive 5' 6" in height. Part of his powerful swing could be attributed to his massive forearms. The other players noticed this physical feature and gave him the nickname Popeye.

Leonard was inducted into Canada's Sports Hall of Fame in 1964, the BC Sports Hall of Fame in 1966, and the Canadian Golf Hall of Fame in 1972. He died of heart failure in Vancouver at the age of 90.

Amateur wins
1932 British Columbia Amateur
1934 Vancouver & Dist. Championship
1935 British Columbia Amateur
1936 Vancouver & Dist. Championship

Professional wins (44)

PGA Tour wins (3)

PGA Tour playoff record (1–1)

Other wins (38)
This list may be incomplete
1937 (2) Northwest Open (as an amateur), Alberta Open
1938 (1) Tacoma Jubilee
1939 (1) Alberta Open
1940 (1) Canadian PGA Championship
1941 (2) Alberta Open, Canadian PGA Championship
1942 (1) Alberta Open
1943 (1) Alberta Open
1947 (2) Alberta Open, British Columbia Open
1948 (1) Vancouver City Match Play Championship
1949 (3) Alberta Open, British Columbia Open, Vancouver City Match Play Championship
1950 (6) Alberta Open, Canadian PGA Championship, British Columbia Open, Vancouver City Match Play Championship, Saskatchewan Open, Western Canada Open
1951 (1) Canadian PGA Championship
1953 (1) Vancouver City Match Play Championship
1954 (3) Canadian PGA Championship, British Columbia Open, Vancouver City Match Play Championship
1955 (2) Alberta Open, Saskatchewan Open
1956 (1) Canadian Match Play
1957 (1) Canadian PGA Championship
1959 (2) Canadian PGA Championship, Canada Cup (individual event)
1960 (2) Northwest Open, Canadian Match Play Open
1961 (1) Canadian PGA Championship
1962 (1) British Columbia Open

Senior wins (3)
1967 Canadian PGA Seniors' Championship
1972 Canadian PGA Seniors' Championship
1975 Canadian PGA Seniors' Championship

Results in major championships

Note: Leonard never played in the PGA Championship.

CUT = missed the half-way cut
"T" indicates a tie for a place

Summary

Most consecutive cuts made – 6 (1957 Masters – 1961 Masters)
Longest streak of top-10s – 3 (1958 Masters – 1960 Masters)

Team appearances
Canada Cup (representing Canada): 1953, 1954, 1955, 1956, 1957, 1959 (individual winner), 1960, 1963
Hopkins Trophy (representing Canada): 1952, 1953, 1954, 1955, 1956

References

External links
Profile at Canadian Golf Hall of Fame
Inductee Accomplishment Summary from British Columbia Golf House

Canadian male golfers
PGA Tour golfers
PGA Tour Champions golfers
Golfing people from British Columbia
Sportspeople from Vancouver
1915 births
2005 deaths